Jacob Joseph (1840–1902) was an American rabbi.

Jacob Joseph, or similar, may also refer to:

 Jacob Joseph (Malaysia football coach) (born 1958), football coach
 Yaakov Yosef Herman (1880–1967), Orthodox Jewish pioneer in the United States
 Ya'akov Yosef (1946–2013), Israeli rabbi

See also
 Joseph Jacob (disambiguation)
 Rabbi Jacob Joseph School, in Staten Island, New York, U.S.

Joseph, Jacob